{{Speciesbox
| image = Livistona RNP.JPG
| image2 = Livistona australis00.jpg
| genus = Livistona
| species = australis
| authority = (R.Br.) Mart.<ref name="ipni">{{cite web |title = IPNI: Livistona australis |url = http://www.ipni.org/ipni/idPlantNameSearch.do?id=100712-3 |website=International Plant Name Index |accessdate=12 June 2018 }}</ref>
}}Livistona australis, the cabbage-tree palm, is an Australian plant species in the family Arecaceae. It is a tall, slender palm growing up to about 25 m in height and 0.35 m diameter. It is crowned with dark, glossy green leaves on petioles 2 m long. It has leaves plaited like a fan; the cabbage of these is small but sweet. In summer it bears flower spikes with sprigs of cream-white flowers. The trees accumulate dead fronds or leaves, which when the plant is in cultivation are often removed by an arborist.

Seeking protection from the sun, early European settlers in Australia used fibre from the native palm to create the cabbage tree hat, a distinctive form of headwear during the colonial era.

Distribution and habitat
Mostly this plant is found in moist open forest, often in swampy sites and on margins of rainforests or near the sea. It is widely spread along the New South Wales coast and extends north into Queensland and southwards to eastern Victoria, growing further south than any other native Australian palm.

Culture
The cabbage-tree palm grows best in moist, organically-rich soils, and thrives in both sheltered and well-lit situations.  It is also salt, frost and wind tolerant, with populations occurring in exposed coastal situations along the east coast of Australia from Queensland to Victoria. The most southerly stand is near Cabbage Tree Creek 30 kilometres east of Orbost, Victoria (37° S).

Reproduction is by seeds. At first the fruit is red, finally turning black, at which point it is ready to be peeled and planted.

Significance in Aboriginal culture
The cabbage-tree palm was called "Dtharowal", where the Tharawal language gets its name from. New growth of the tree could be cooked or eaten raw and the heart of the trunk could be cooked as a medicine to ease a sore throat.  Leaves of the cabbage-tree palm were used for shelter and fibres for string, rope and fishing lines.

Gallery

References
Citations

Sources

 Boland, D.J.; Brooker, M.I.H.; Chippendale, G.M.; Hall, N.; Hyland, B.P.M.; Johnston, R.D.; Kleinig, D.A.; & Turner, J.D. (1984). Forest Trees of Australia''. (4th edition). Thomas Nelson, Australia; and CSIRO: Melbourne. .

External links

Australasian Virtual Herbarium: occurrence data for Livistona australis
PlantNET: Livistona australis description

australis
Palms of Australia
Ornamental trees
Flora of New South Wales
Flora of Queensland
Flora of Victoria (Australia)
Plants described in 1810